In  satellite laser ranging  (SLR) a global network of observation stations measures the round trip time of flight of ultrashort pulses of light to satellites equipped with retroreflectors. This provides instantaneous range measurements of millimeter level precision which can be accumulated to provide accurate measurement of orbits and a host of important scientific data. The laser pulse can also be reflected by the surface of a satellite without a retroreflector, which is used for tracking space debris.

Satellite laser ranging is a proven geodetic technique with significant potential for important contributions to scientific studies of the earth/atmosphere/ocean system. It is the most accurate technique currently available to determine the geocentric position of an Earth satellite, allowing for the precise calibration of radar altimeters and separation of long-term instrumentation drift from secular changes in ocean topography.

Its ability to measure the variations over time in Earth's gravity field and to monitor motion of the station network with respect to the geocenter, together with the capability to monitor vertical motion in an absolute system, makes it unique for modeling and evaluating long-term climate change by:

  providing a reference system for post-glacial rebound, plate tectonics, sea level and ice volume change
  determining the temporal mass redistribution of the solid earth, ocean, and atmosphere system
  determining Earth orientation parameters, such as Earth pole coordinates and length-of-day variations
  determining of precise satellite orbits for artificial satellites with and without active devices onboard
  monitoring the response of the atmosphere to seasonal variations in solar heating.

SLR provides a unique capability for verification of the predictions of the theory of general relativity, such as the frame-dragging effect.

SLR stations form an important part of the international network of space geodetic observatories, which include VLBI, GPS, DORIS and PRARE systems. On several critical missions, SLR has provided failsafe redundancy when other radiometric tracking systems have failed.

History 

Laser ranging to a near-Earth satellite was first carried out by NASA in 1964 with the launch of the Beacon-B satellite. Since that time, ranging precision, spurred by scientific requirements, has improved by a factor of a thousand from a few metres to a few millimetres, and more satellites equipped with retroreflectors have been launched.

Several sets of retroreflectors were installed on Earth's Moon as part of the American Apollo and Soviet Lunokhod space programs. These retroreflectors are also ranged on a regular basis (lunar laser ranging), providing a highly accurate measurement of the dynamics of the Earth/Moon system.

During the subsequent decades, the global satellite laser ranging network has evolved into a powerful source of data for studies of the solid Earth and its ocean and atmospheric systems. In addition, SLR provides precise orbit determination for spaceborne radar altimeter missions mapping the ocean surface (which are used to model global ocean circulation), for
mapping volumetric changes in continental ice masses, and for land topography. It provides a means for subnanosecond global time transfer, and a basis for special tests of the Theory of General Relativity.

The International Laser Ranging Service was formed in 1998 by the global SLR community to enhance  geophysical and geodetic research activities, replacing the previous CSTG Satellite and Laser Ranging Subcommission.

Applications 
SLR data has provided the standard, highly accurate, long wavelength gravity field reference model which supports all precision orbit determination and provides the basis for studying temporal gravitational variations due to mass redistribution. The height of the geoid has been determined to less than ten centimeters at long wavelengths less than 1,500 km.

SLR provides mm/year accurate determinations of tectonic drift station motion on a global scale in a geocentric reference frame. Combined with gravity models and decadal changes in Earth rotation, these results contribute to modeling of convection in the Earth's mantle by providing constraints on related Earth interior processes. The velocity of the fiducial station in Hawaii is 70 mm/year and closely matches the rate of the background geophysical model.

List of satellites

List of passive satellites 

Several dedicated laser ranging satellites were put in orbit:
Ajisai (Experimental Geodetic Payload)
 BLITS
Calsphere satellites
 Etalon
Kosmos 1989
Kosmos 2024
LAGEOS
LAGEOS 1
LAGEOS 2, see STS-52
 LARES
 Larets
 STARSHINE
Starshine 1, see STS-96
Starshine 2, see STS-108
 Starlette and Stella

List of shared satellites 
Several satellites carried laser retroreflectors, sharing the bus with other instruments:
Beacon Explorers (Beacon Explorer-B and Beacon Explorer-C)
GEOS (GEOS-1, GEOS-2, GEOS-3)

CHAMP
GRACE
GOCE
 Navigation satellites
 GLONASS
 GPS (two experimental satellites)
 Galileo
 BeiDou
 NavIC
 QZSS
Altimeter satellites
 GEOS-3
 TOPEX/Poseidon
 Sentinel-3
 SARAL

See also 
 Lidar
 Lunar laser ranging
 Retroreflector#In satellites
 Laser communication in space

References

Further reading 
  (public domain) Seeber, Günter (2003) Satellite Geodesy Walter de Gruyter  pg 404
 Kramer, Herbert J. (2002) Observation of the Earth and Its Environment: Survey of Missions and Sensors Springer  pg 131-132
 Turcotte, Donald L. (ed) (1993) Contributions of Space Geodesy to Geodynamics'' Washington, DC: American Geophysical Union Geodynamics Series, ISSN 0277-6669
 U.S. National Research Council (1985) Geodesy: a look to the future NAP pg 80-84

External links 
 International Laser Ranging Service website
 McDonald Laser Ranging Station
 NERC Space Geodesy Facility
 Retroreflectors on the Moon
 Fixed Shutter Dome (FSD) for SLR